The Catholic Bishops' Conference of Korea is the Catholic episcopal conference of Korea.

List of presidents
Thomas F. Quinlan, S.S.C.M.E., Bishop of Chunchon (1959–1964)
Paul Roh Ki-nam, Archbishop of Seoul (1964–1967)
Victorinus Youn Kong-hi, Bishop of Suwon (1967–1970)
Cardinal Stephen Kim Sou-hwan, Archbishop of Seoul (1970–1975)
Victorinus Youn Kong-hi, Archbishop of Gwangju (1975–1981)
Cardinal Stephen Kim Sou-hwan, Archbishop of Seoul (1981–1987)
Angelo Kim Nam-su, Bishop of Suwon (1987–1993)
Paul Ri Moun-hi, Archbishop of Daegu (1993–1996)
Nicholas Cheong Jin-suk, Archbishop of Seoul (1996–1999)
Michael Pak Jeong-il, Bishop of Masan (1999–2002)
Andreas Choi Chang-mou, Archbishop of Gwangju (2002–2005)
Augustine Cheong Myong-jo, Bishop of Busan (2005–2006)
John Chang Yik, Bishop of Chunchon (2006–2008)
Peter Kang U-il, Bishop of Cheju (2008–2014)
Hyginus Kim Hee-jong, Archbishop of Gwangju (2014–2020)
Matthias Ri Iong-hoon, Bishop of Suwon (2020–present)

See also
 Catholic Church in Korea
 Catholic Church in South Korea
 Korean Catholic Bible

References

External links
 

Korea
Catholic Church in Korea